The Ngái (Chữ Nôm:
) are a Hakka-speaking community in Vietnam and other nearby countries of Indochina, whose ancestors were Southern Chinese. The Vietnamese government separated Ngai from Cantonese when considering ethnic minority groups. 

According to Vietnamese sources the Ngái people speak Hakka, a Sino-Tibetan language but are classified separately from the Hoa or urban ethnic "Overseas Chinese". The Ngái population was 4,841 in 1999 but down only 1,035 in 2009 and up to 1,649 in 2019.

See also 
Chinese Nùng 
Hakka people

References

Chinese diaspora in Asia
Ethnic groups in Vietnam
Hakka